Norman Fruchter (August 11, 1937 – January 4, 2023) was an American writer, filmmaker, and academic.

Life and career
Fruchter was born in Philadelphia, Pennsylvania, on August 11, 1937. He graduated from Rutgers University, in 1959, where he edited the literary magazine, Anthologist.

Fruchter was arrested protesting with CORE and James Farmer, Bayard Rustin, Rev. Donald Harrington, and Michael Harrington, at the 1964 New York World's Fair.  From 1960 to 1962, he served as assistant to the editor of New Left Review.  He was an editor at Studies on the Left, (1959–1967).

Newsreel
Prior to becoming a member of Newsreel which was founded in 1967, Fruchter and Robert Machover made 'Troublemakers', an award-winning documentary about an organizing effort by members of Students for a Democratic Society (SDS) in the Black wards of Newark, New Jersey. As part of their mission to instigate social change, members of Newsreel would present films to political organizations and community groups across the United States. The retrospective, Exit Art / The First World had Newsreel members Norman Fruchter, Roz Payne and Lynn Phillips discuss the films.  He was a member of SDS along with Tom Hayden, Jesse Allen, Robert Kramer, also full-time organizers for the group: Carol Glassman; Terry Jefferson; Constance Brown; Corinna Fales; and Derek Winans.  He was investigated by the House Un-American Activities Committee. He co-founded and co-directed Independence High School, an alternative high school for drop-outs in Newark, New Jersey, throughout most of the 1970s.

Fruchter recommended Christine Choy to the Newsreel group, after meeting her at Ironbound neighborhood in Newark, New Jersey.

Education
Fruchter was a member of School Board 15, in Brooklyn from 1983–94. He helped to form Campaign for Fiscal Equity, which sued the city of New York over inadequate school funding. He co-founded and headed the Institute for Education and Social Policy at New York University from 1987–1996.

Personal life and death
Fruchter married Rachel G. Fruchter (died 1997), who was member of the Department of Obstetrics and Gynecology State University of New York for nearly 25 years. After her untimely death he married Heather Lewis, a former Newsreel member and school board colleague. Fruchter had two children and four grandchildren.

Fruchter died on January 4, 2023, at the age of 85, from injuries sustained in a traffic collision on December 22.

Awards
Fruchter won the first Edward Lewis Wallant Award. His documentary, "Troublemakers" was selected for premiere screening at the New York Film Festival and subsequently featured at film festivals around the world.

Works

Novels

Academic papers

Commentary
 
 
Profile of The Ginger Man's author J. P. Donleavy.
 
Review of the film The Savage Eye.
 
Cited in:  Preview.
 
Cited in:  Preview.

Filmography
 Race Against Prime Time - ( Narrator(- Narration) / 1984 / Released / Albany Video )
 The People's War - ( Director / 1970 / Released / )
 WE GOT TO LIVE HERE, Robert Machover & Norman Fruchter, (1965, 16mm B&W/sound, 20 min.)
 Troublemakers, Robert Machover & Norman Fruchter, (1966, 16mm B&W/sound, 54 min.)
 FALN (1965), Peter Gessner, Norman Fruchter and Robert Machover, Robert Kramer
Summer '68 (1969)

References

External links

Robert Kramer and John Douglas interviewed: “Reclaiming our past, reclaiming our beginning“, G. Roy Levin, JUMP CUT

1937 births
2023 deaths
20th-century American male writers
20th-century American novelists
American male novelists
New York University faculty
Novelists from New York (state)
Rutgers University alumni